The Anxiety is a collaborative studio album by American musicians Willow Smith and Tyler Cole, under the band name The Anxiety. The project was released by the duo on March 13, 2020, by MSFTSMusic and Roc Nation. While the album didn't chart at the time of its release it entered the charts in late 2021 after album track "Meet Me at Our Spot" became a sleeper hit on TikTok. It became Cole's first ever charting album and Willow's first charting album in Canada.

Background
Willow Smith and Tyler Cole have been romantic partners and artistic collaborators for several years. Prior to The Anxiety, Cole co-produced her 2019 self-titled album. The band released their debut single "Hey You!" on February 28, 2020.

Art exhibit
In promotion of the project, Smith and Cole staged a performance art piece at the Museum of Contemporary Art, Los Angeles on March 11, 2020, wherein the duo were locked in a glass box for 24 hours and were not allowed to speak to each other. One wall was clear for the audience to view, with the other three covered in canvas for the duo to write affirmations on. The performance is meant to convey the eight stages of anxiety (paranoia, rage, sadness, numbness, euphoria, strong interest, compassion and acceptance) with each stage lasting three hours. The performance was seen as topical due to it occurring just days before COVID-19 lockdowns in the United States.

Composition
The Anxiety is a punk, indie rock, alternative rock, dream pop, and progressive rock album. The album's first half largely consists of "uptempo rhythms and punchy riffs", dabbles in lo-fi around the middle, and the second half contains "pensive R&B and drone-like ballads". Lyrically, the album tackles themes of anxiety, rage, panic attacks, and government corruption.

Track listing

Notes
 signifies a co-producer

Charts

Weekly charts

Year-end charts

References

2020 debut albums
Collaborative albums
Willow Smith albums
Roc Nation albums
Alternative rock albums by American artists
Indie rock albums by American artists
Punk rock albums by American artists
Dream pop albums by American artists
Progressive rock albums by American artists